Matsyasana (IAST: Matsyāsana) or Fish pose is a reclining back-bending asana in hatha yoga and modern yoga as exercise.

It is commonly considered a counterasana to Sarvangasana, or shoulder stand, specifically within the context of the Ashtanga Vinyasa Yoga Primary Series.

Etymology and origins

The name comes from the Sanskrit words matsya (मत्स्य) meaning "fish" and asana (आसन) meaning "posture" or "seat".

The asana is medieval, described in the 17th century Gheraṇḍa Saṃhitā 2.21.

Description
The asana is a backbend, where the practitioner lies on his or her back and lifts the heart (anahata) chakra by rising up on the elbows and drawing the shoulders back. The neck is lengthened, and the crown of the head Sahasrara chakra is "pointed" toward the 'wall' behind the practitioner. As the arch of the back deepens with practice, and the heart and throat open further, the top of the head may brush the ground, but no weight should rest upon it.

Variations

 The legs can be kept straight on the ground, or with knees bent and feet on the floor, for practitioners unable to do Padmasana with the legs.
 The legs again straight can be lifted off the ground, for a "challenging variation".
 The hands may be placed before the heart in Añjali Mudrā, making the pose more difficult.

The pose can be supported with a bolster under the back, and with a cushion under the knees.

References

Further reading

External links
 Matsyasana

Reclining asanas
Medieval Hatha Yoga asanas
Backbend asanas